Lacey Thomas (born April 26, 1910) is an American former Negro league outfielder who played in the 1930s and 1940s.

A native of Meridian, Mississippi, Thomas made his Negro leagues debut in 1935 for the Chicago American Giants. He went on to play several seasons for the Jacksonville Red Caps/Cleveland Bears franchise through 1944.

References

External links
 and Baseball-Reference Black Baseball stats and Seamheads

1910 births
Year of death missing
Chicago American Giants players
Jacksonville Red Caps players
Baseball outfielders
Baseball players from Mississippi
Sportspeople from Meridian, Mississippi